Invergordon distillery is a grain whisky distillery located at Invergordon in Easter Ross, in Ross and Cromarty, Highland, Scotland.

The distillery is operated by Whyte & Mackay, which Philippines-based Alliance Global owns.

It was established in 1959. Along with Tamnavulin distillery in Speyside it provides whisky for the company's blended Scotch whisky brands.

See also
 Invergordon Distillery Pipe Band
 List of distilleries in Scotland
 List of whisky brands

References

Distilleries in Scotland
1959 establishments in Scotland
Invergordon